Loux Covered Bridge is a historic wooden covered bridge located on Wismer Road crossing Cabin Run (creek) upstream from the Cabin Run Covered Bridge in Bedminster Township and Plumstead Township, Bucks County, Pennsylvania. It was built in 1874 by David Sutton out of hemlock in the Town Truss style.

The bridge was added to the National Register of Historic Places on December 1, 1980.

See also
National Register of Historic Places listings in Bucks County, Pennsylvania
List of bridges documented by the Historic American Engineering Record in Pennsylvania
List of bridges on the National Register of Historic Places in Pennsylvania

References

External links

Historic American Engineering Record in Pennsylvania
Covered bridges in Bucks County, Pennsylvania
Covered bridges on the National Register of Historic Places in Pennsylvania
Bridges in Bucks County, Pennsylvania
Tourist attractions in Bucks County, Pennsylvania
National Register of Historic Places in Bucks County, Pennsylvania
Road bridges on the National Register of Historic Places in Pennsylvania
Wooden bridges in Pennsylvania
Lattice truss bridges in the United States